Parupeneus barberinoides, the bicolor goatfish, is a species of goatfish native to the western Pacific Ocean. This is a commercially important species and can also be found in the aquarium trade.

References

External links
 

barberinoides
Fish described in 1852